BTT may refer to:

 Bhutan Time, UTC+6 hours
 Brazilian Top Team, Brazilian mixed martial arts academy
 Bettles Airport, IATA code
 Banking Transformation Toolkit, part of IBM websphere
 Banking Transaction Tax, A form of tax on cash withdrawal & other bank transactions in India
 Bayerische Theatertage, theatre festival in Germany
 Betrayal trauma theory